Phyfe is a surname. Notable people with the surname include:

Duncan Phyfe (1768–1854), American cabinetmaker
Owain Phyfe (1949–2012), American vocalist, instrumentalist, and composer
Hal Phyfe (1892–1968), American portrait photographer